Zsolt is a Hungarian masculine given name, originally a variant of Solt.

Related names
 Zsolt: old Hungarian personal name, with an identical origin to the names Zoltán, Zsolt and possibly Csolt. Derived from the old Turkish word "sultan".

Name-day
 April 10
 October 21
 November 20

People with the given name
 Zoltán of Hungary, also known as Zsolt
 Zsolt Balázs
 Zsolt Bárányos
 Zsolt Baumgartner
 Zsolt Bayer, commentator for Magyar Hírlap
 Zsolt Bedák
 Zsolt Bodoni (born 1975), Hungarian painter
 Zsolt Borkai
 Zsolt Erdei
 Zsolt Gyulay
 Zsolt Haraszti
 Zsolt Harsányi
 Zsolt Horváth (disambiguation)
 Zsolt Kalmár
 Zsolt Korcsmár
 Zsolt Kosz
 Zsolt Kürtösi
 Zsolt Laczkó
 Zsolt Nagy (disambiguation), several people
 Zsolt Nemcsik
 Zsolt Németh (disambiguation)
 Zsolt Szabó (disambiguation)
 Zsolt Szeglet

People with the surname
 Béla Zsolt
 István Zsolt

Hungarian masculine given names